The 2020 Copa de la Liga Profesional (officially Copa Diego Armando Maradona) was the first edition of the Copa de la Liga Profesional, an Argentine domestic cup contested by the 24 teams that took part in the Primera División during the 2019–20 season. The tournament was named after Diego Maradona. The competition started on 30 October 2020 and ended on 31 March 2021.

The competition was planned and organised by the "Liga Profesional de Fútbol", a body linked to the Argentine Football Association (AFA) that replaced the defunct Superliga Argentina. This cup was conceived as a contingency competition after the schedule for a regular league season had been repeatedly delayed because of the COVID-19 pandemic.

Boca Juniors and Banfield advanced to the Fase Campeón Final. Boca Juniors won the Final via a penalty shoot-out after the game had finished 1–1 and were crowned as champions of the cup. As Boca Juniors had already qualified for the 2021 Copa Libertadores, San Lorenzo (best team of the 2019–20 Superliga Argentina and 2020 Copa de la Superliga aggregate table not yet qualified) gained the 2021 Copa Libertadores berth.

Format

For the group stage, the 24 teams were drawn into six groups of four teams each, playing on a double round-robin basis. In each zone, the top two teams advanced to the "Fase Campeón" while the bottom two teams advanced to the "Fase Complementación".

In the Fase Campeón, the 12 qualified teams were split into two groups of six teams each, where they played a single round-robin tournament. The winners of each group played the final match at a neutral venue. The winners of the Fase Campeón final were crowned champions of the cup and qualified for the 2021 Copa Libertadores.

On the other hand, teams in Fase Complementación played under the same format as in the Fase Campeón. The winners of the Fase Complementación final played a match against the Fase Campeón runners-up with the winners qualifying for the 2022 Copa Sudamericana.

Draws
The draw for the group stage was held on 16 October 2020, 14:00, at Complejo Habitacional de Ezeiza in Ezeiza. The 24 teams were drawn into six groups of four containing one team from each of the four pots.

The draws for the Fase Campeón and the Fase Complementación were held on 7 December 2020, 21:30, at Complejo Habitacional de Ezeiza in Ezeiza. For the Fase Campeón, the winners and runners-up of each zone were allocated to Pot 3 and Pot 4, respectively. Likewise, for the Fase Complementación, the third-placed teams and fourth-placed teams of each zone were allocated to Pot 1 and Pot 2, respectively.

For each stage, the 12 qualified teams were drawn into two groups of six containing three teams from each of the two pots. Teams from the same zone could not be drawn into the same group.

Group stage
In the group stage ("Fase Clasificación"), each group was played on a home-and-away round-robin basis. Teams were ranked according to the following criteria: 1. Points (3 points for a win, 1 point for a draw, and 0 points for a loss); 2. Goal difference; 3. Goals scored; 4. Head-to-head points; 5. Head-to-head goal difference; 6. Head-to-head goals scored (Regulations Article 2.1).

The winners and runners-up of each group advanced to the "Fase Campeón" while the bottom two teams advanced to the "Fase Complementación".

Zone 1

Zone 2

Zone 3

Zone 4

Zone 5

Zone 6

Fase Campeón
In the Fase Campeón, each group comprised three winners and three runners-up from the group stage. The groups were played on a single round-robin basis, with the group stage winners playing three home matches. Teams were ranked according to the following criteria: 1. Points (3 points for a win, 1 point for a draw, and 0 points for a loss); 2. Goal difference; 3. Goals scored; 4. Head-to-head points; 5. Head-to-head goal difference; 6. Head-to-head goals scored (Regulations Article 2.2).

The Fase Campeón final match was played between the winners of each group at a neutral venue. If tied, a penalty shoot-out would be used to determine the champions (Regulations Article 2.2). The champions qualified for the 2021 Copa Libertadores.

Group A

Group B

Final

Fase Complementación
In the Fase Complementación, each group comprised three third-placed teams and three fourth-placed teams from the group stage. The groups were played on a single round-robin basis, with the third-placed teams playing three home matches. Teams were ranked according to the following criteria: 1. Points (3 points for a win, 1 point for a draw, and 0 points for a loss); 2. Goal difference; 3. Goals scored; 4. Head-to-head points; 5. Head-to-head goal difference; 6. Head-to-head goals scored (Regulations Article 2.3).

The Fase Complementación final match was played between the winners of each group at a neutral venue. If tied, a penalty shoot-out would be used to determine the winners (Regulations Articles 2.3).

Group A

Group B

Final

2022 Copa Sudamericana qualifying play-off
The Fase Complementación winners, Vélez Sarsfield, played a match against the Fase Campeón runners-up, Banfield, at a neutral venue, with the winners qualifying for the 2022 Copa Sudamericana. If tied, a penalty shoot-out would be used to determine the winners (Regulations Article 4.7).

Statistics

Top goalscorers 

Source: AFA

References

External links 
 LPF official site

A
2020 in Argentine football